Elsa Wallenberg (née Lilliehöök, 26 January 1877 – 17 October 1951) was a Swedish tennis player who competed in the indoor singles event at the 1908 Summer Olympics. She reached the final in which she lost to eventual Olympic champions Gwendoline Eastlake-Smith. In the bronze medal match Wallenberg lost to compatriot Märtha Adlerstråhle.

She was married to Axel Wallenberg (1874-1963). They were the parents of Gustaf Wally.

References

1877 births
1951 deaths
Swedish female tennis players
Olympic tennis players of Sweden
Tennis players at the 1908 Summer Olympics
People from Hallsberg Municipality
Elsa